Convoy SL 78 was the 78th of the numbered series of World War II SL convoys of merchant ships from Sierra Leone to Liverpool. Ships carrying commodities bound to the British Isles from South America, Africa, and the Indian Ocean traveled independently to Freetown to be convoyed for the last leg of their voyage. Twenty-five merchant ships departed Freetown on 18 June 1941. U-boats sank eight ships before the convoy reached Liverpool on 12 July.

Ships in the Convoy

Allied merchant ships
A total of 26 merchant vessels joined the convoy, either in Sierra Leone or later in the voyage.

Convoy escorts
A series of armed military ships escorted the convoy at various times during its journey.

References

Bibliography

External links
SL.78 at convoyweb

SL078
C